WTCR-FM (103.3 FM) is a radio station broadcasting a country format. Licensed to Huntington, West Virginia, United States, it serves the Huntington area. The station is owned by iHeartMedia. From 1993 to 2017, the morning show was hosted by radio personalities Clint McElroy and Judy Eaton.

References

External links
 

TCR-FM
IHeartMedia radio stations